Patrice Thévenard (born 25 October 1954) is a former French racing cyclist. His sporting career began with ACBB Paris. He rode in three editions of the Tour de France between 1979 and 1984.

References

External links
 

1954 births
Living people
French male cyclists
Sportspeople from Seine-et-Marne
Cyclists from Île-de-France